FC Yudzhin Samara was a Russian football team from Samara. It played professionally from 1990 to 1994. Their best result was 9th place in the Russian Second Division (Zone 5 in 1992 and Zone 6 in 1993).

Team name history
 1990–1991: FC Zarya Podgorny (representing Podgorny, Samara Oblast)
 1992–1993: FC Zarya Krotovka (representing Krotovka, Samara Oblast)
 1994: FC Yudzhin Samara

External links
  Team history at KLISF

Association football clubs established in 1990
Association football clubs disestablished in 1995
Defunct football clubs in Russia
Sport in Samara, Russia
Sport in Samara Oblast
1990 establishments in Russia
1995 disestablishments in Russia